The WAGR A/AA/AB classes are classes of diesel locomotives built by Clyde Engineering, Granville, New South Wales, Australia, for the Western Australian Government Railways (WAGR) between 1960 and 1969.

History
In July 1960 Clyde Engineering delivered the first of the WAGR's 14 A class locomotives. Six were assembled under contract by Commonwealth Engineering at Bassendean becoming the first diesel locomotives built in Western Australia. The last two were financed by Western Mining Corporation. A1506, A1513-14 were fitted with dynamic brakes.

In 1967 five improved AA class were delivered, followed by six AB classes in 1969. All were built at Granville and fitted with more powerful Electro Motive Diesel 12-645E engines.

In January 1998 ten (A1502-A1510 & AB1533) were sold to Tranz Rail. All were shipped to New Zealand in February 1998. Five were scrapped for parts, one sold to Tasrail for parts and in November 2005, four were sold as hulks to National Railway Equipment Company and shipped to Mount Vernon, Illinois. Two of the latter were rebuilt and in 2010 sold to Ferrocarril de Antofagasta a Bolivia. There they were reunited with seven (A1512, AA1515-AA1519 & AB1532) that had been sold to the Chile operator in September 1998.

Those remaining with Westrail were included in the sale of the business to Australian Railroad Group in October 2000. When the business was split in June 2006, A1513 and A1514 were transferred to Genesee & Wyoming Australia with the South Australian operations and were reclassified as the 1200 class while A1501 and the remaining four ABs passed to QR National with the Western Australian operations, and were renumbered AB1501-AB1504. In January 2008, A1501 was withdrawn and donated to Rail Heritage WA. A1202, AB1501 and AB1502 were exported to South Africa in January 2015.

In April 2017, AB1535 was donated to Rail Heritage WA for use with the Wheatbelt Heritage Rail Project at Minnivale.

Class list (A)

Class list (AA)

Class list (AB)

References

Notes

Bibliography

External links

A class History of Western Australia Railways & Stations gallery
AB class History of Western Australia Railways & Stations gallery

Aurizon diesel locomotives
Clyde Engineering locomotives
Co-Co locomotives
Diesel locomotives of Western Australia
Railway locomotives introduced in 1960
3 ft 6 in gauge locomotives of Australia
Diesel-electric locomotives of Australia